Davispur, also known as Tibiwala, is a small village in the Sargodha district of Punjab, Pakistan.

Schools
Davispur is home to a government public school for boys and girls, and a private school.

References

Villages in Sargodha District
Populated places in Sargodha District